Charles Edgar Loseby (1881 – 1970) was a captain, lawyer and British  politician being Member of Parliament for Bradford East.

Before World War I, he was a teacher at St Cyprian's School, Eastbourne and in 1912 he taught at Winchester House School in Deal, Kent. He joined the army in September 1914 and went to serve in France. He was gassed at Ypres in May 1915.

At the 1918 general election, he was elected as Coalition National Democratic member for Bradford East, and served in the House of Commons until the 1922 general election.

After the Coalition government ended he remained an advocate of close co-operation between the Liberal and Conservative parties; He was a supporter of Winston Churchill and like Churchill contested the 1924 General election as a Constitutionalist at Nottingham West. He was unsuccessful at the election and before the 1929 General election, he had joined the Conservatives, standing as a candidate for them in 1929.

He lived in Hong Kong and became the chairman of the Hong Kong Bar Association in 1953 and first chairman of the Reform Club of Hong Kong which was founded to campaign for direct elections to the Legislative Council of Hong Kong.

References

External links 
 Portrait of Loseby in 1921
 

1881 births
1970 deaths
Members of the Parliament of the United Kingdom for English constituencies
National Democratic and Labour Party MPs
National Liberal Party (UK, 1922) politicians
UK MPs 1918–1922
People educated at St Cyprian's School
Politics of Bradford
20th-century King's Counsel
Hong Kong Queen's Counsel
Reform Club of Hong Kong politicians
Barristers of Hong Kong
Conservative Party (UK) parliamentary candidates